This was a new event to the ITF Women's Circuit.

Chang Kai-chen won the inaugural title, defeating Zhang Yuxuan in the final, 4–6, 6–1, 7–6(7–0).

Seeds

Main draw

Finals

Top half

Bottom half

References 
 Main draw

Zhuhai ITF Women's Pro Circuit - Singles
Zhuhai Open